Welwitschia is a monotypic gymnosperm genus, comprising solely the distinctive Welwitschia mirabilis, endemic to the Namib desert within Namibia and Angola. Welwitschia is the only living genus of the family Welwitschiaceae and order Welwitschiales in the division Gnetophyta, and is one of three living genera in Gnetophyta, alongside Gnetum and Ephedra. Informal sources commonly refer to the plant as a "living fossil".

Naming

Welwitschia is named after the Austrian botanist and doctor Friedrich Welwitsch, who described the plant in Angola in 1859. Welwitsch was so overwhelmed by the plant that he, "could do nothing but kneel down [...] and gaze at it, half in fear lest a touch should prove it a figment of the imagination." Joseph Dalton Hooker of the Linnean Society of London, using Welwitsch's description and collected material along with material from the artist Thomas Baines who had independently recorded the plant in Namibia, described the species.

Welwitsch proposed calling the genus Tumboa after what he believed to be the local name, tumbo. Hooker asked Welwitsch for permission to name the genus Welwitschia instead. Welwitsch concurred and supplied some well-preserved material from which Hooker was able to make substantial progress in determining its botanical affinities. The taxonomy of Welwitschia subsequently changed intermittently with the development of new classification systems (see Flowering plants: History of classification), however, its current taxonomic status is essentially the same as Hooker's placement.

Most botanists have treated Welwitschia as a distinct monotypic genus in a monotypic family or even order.  Most recent systems place Welwitschia mirabilis in its own family Welwitschiaceae in the gymnosperm order Gnetales, although other extinct species have been placed in this family.

The plant is commonly known simply as welwitschia in English, but the name tree tumbo is also used.

Biology
Subsequently, two foliage leaves are produced at the edge of a woody bilobed crown. The permanent leaves are opposite (at right angles to the cotyledons), amphistomatic (producing stomata on both sides of the leaf), parallel-veined and ribbon-shaped. Shortly after the appearance of the foliage leaves, the apical meristem dies and meristematic activity is transferred to the periphery of the crown.

The tips of the leaves split and fray into several well-separated strap-shaped sections by the distortions of the woody portions surrounding the apical slit, and also by wind and adventitious external injuries.

Welwitschia has an elongated shallow root system consisting of "a tapering taproot with one or more non-tapering extensions, some pronounced lateral roots, and a network of delicate spongy roots" and a woody fibrous unbranched main stem.  The roots extend to a depth roughly equal to the span of the living leaves from tip to tip. The main stem consists of an unbranched woody crown roughly shaped like an inverted cone. The only branching in the shoot system occurs in the reproductive branches, which bear strobili.

The species is dioecious, with separate male and female plants. Fertilization is carried out by insects including flies and true bugs. The most common of the true bugs attending Welwitschia is a member of the family Pyrrhocoridae, Probergrothius angolensis, but a hypothesized role in pollination has so far not been demonstrated. Infrequently, wasps and bees also play a role as pollinators of Welwitschia. At least some of the pollinators are attracted by "nectar" produced on both male and female strobili.

Welwitschia has been classified as a CAM plant (crassulacean acid metabolism) after reconciliation of some initially contradictory and confusing data. There are however some very puzzling aspects to the matter; for example, the employment of the CAM metabolism is very slight, which was part of the reason that it took so long to establish its presence at all; it is not understood why this should be.

The age of individual plants is difficult to assess, but many plants may be over 1,000 years old. Some individuals may be more than 2,000 years old. As the species does not produce yearly rings, plant age is determined by radiocarbon dating. However, other reports suggest that the plant does produce a kind of yearly ring. The "trunk" continues to expand with age.

Because Welwitschia only produces a single pair of foliage leaves, the plant was thought by some to be neotenic, consisting essentially of a "giant seedling." However, research showed that its anatomy is not consistent with the giant seedling idea. Instead, the plant is more accurately thought to achieve its unusual morphology as a result of having "lost its head" (apical meristem) at an early stage.

Genetics 
In July 2021, the genome of Welwitschia was 98% sequenced, totaling 6.8 Gb on 21 chromosomes. There is evidence of a whole genome duplication followed by extensive reshuffling, probably caused by extreme stress due to a time of increased aridity and prolonged drought some 86 million years ago. As a result of this duplication, the genome contains more “junk” self-replicating DNA sequences; this increase in retrotransposon activity was counteracted with a silencing DNA methylation process allowing to lower the metabolic cost of such a large genetic material and improve resilience.

Distribution and habitat
Welwitschia mirabilis is endemic to the Kaokoveld Desert, which lies within the Namib Desert. Populations tend to occur in ephemeral watercourses, indicating a dependence on groundwater in addition to precipitation from fog.

Cultivation
Welwitschia mirabilis grows readily from seed, which may be bought from specialty seed dealers.  The seeds have been shown to display orthodox seed behavior, which in general means that they may be stored for long periods at suitably low humidity and temperature. Welwitschia seeds naturally develop suitably low water concentrations as they ripen. Removal of the outer seed coverings enhances germination performance, which suggests that the seeds may display non-deep physiological dormancy. On planting the seed it is necessary to keep it moist, but not immersed in water, for the first two weeks of cultivation; it has been suggested that soaking the seeds in water before planting interferes with germination.

Seeds collected from the wild often are heavily contaminated with spores of the fungus Aspergillus niger var. phoenicis, which causes them to rot shortly after they germinate. The fungal inoculum infects the growing cones of W. mirabilis early during their development, and a sharp increase in infection occurs when the pollination drops appear; through those drops the fungal spores may gain access to the interior of the developing seed.  Seeds in the wild may therefore be obliterated through fungal action even before they are fully developed. Seeds from botanical gardens or other cultivated sources are much cleaner and less likely to rot.  The fungicide tebuconazole may be useful in controlling limited A. niger seed infection.

As food 
Indigenous people eat the cone of this plant by eating it raw or baking it in hot ashes. One of its names, onyanga translates to 'onion of the desert'.

Conservation
The population of Welwitschia mirabilis in the wild is reasonably satisfactory at present. The international trade in the plant is controlled under the Convention on International Trade in Endangered Species of Wild Fauna and Flora (CITES). Plants in Angola are better protected than those in Namibia, because the relatively high concentration of land mines in Angola keep collectors away.

Although Welwitschia mirabilis is not at present immediately threatened, there being abundant populations over a large area, its status is far from secure; its recruitment and growth rates are low, and its range, though wide, covers only a single compact, ecologically limited and vulnerable area. The remarkable longevity of Welwitschia favours its survival of temporary periods adverse to reproduction, but it offers no protection against circumstances of direct threat, such as overgrazing and disease. Fungal infection of female cones severely reduces seed viability, reducing already inherently low recruitment. Other threats include injury from off-road vehicles, collection of wild plants and overgrazing by zebras, rhinos, and domestic animals.

Heraldry
The plant figures in the compartment of the national coat of arms of Namibia.

Gallery

See also
 List of Southern African indigenous trees and woody lianes

References

External links
 
 
 Gymnosperm database: Welwitschia
 Ecology & Evolutionary Biology Conservatory (archived)
 The Welwitschia Page: photos of Welwitschia in the wild (archived)
 Welwitschia mirabilis (archived)
 Bihrmann's Welwitschia growing project
 "So What If It's Ugly? It Just Keeps On Going ..."
 

Welwitschiaceae
Endangered plants
Endemic flora of Angola
Endemic flora of Namibia
Flora of Southern Africa
Monotypic gymnosperm genera
Dioecious plants